Palace of Desire is a novel by Egyptian writer Naguib Mahfouz, and the second installment of Mahfouz's Cairo Trilogy.  It was originally published in Arabic in 1957.

The plot continues the story of al-Sayyid Ahmad's family as the patriarch loosens his once strangling grip of control over his wife and children. His sons grapple with love and loss and their place in the changing world of colonial Egypt. The father is forced to confront his age and difficulties that come with having adult children you can no longer control. 

Novels by Naguib Mahfouz
1957 novels
Arabic-language novels
Novels set in Cairo